The Spirits Business is a British magazine aimed at distillers, distillery proprietors and other spirits industry professionals that concentrates on the fine spirits end of the beverage industry.

History and profile
The Spirits Business was founded in 2007. The magazine was produced by the publishers of the Drinks Business Magazine and is published monthly by Union Press and had a circulation of 13,000 copies in April 2018.

It produces the Global Spirits Masters, an annual industry award series presented in London since 2008. The series features blind tasting competitions in the world with entries welcomed from distillers across 120 countries with a reach across 45,000 spirit professionals worldwide.

See also
 List of food and drink magazines

References

External links

Is Saturday A Business Day

2001 establishments in the United Kingdom
Business magazines published in the United Kingdom
Monthly magazines published in the United Kingdom
Food and drink magazines
Magazines published in London
Magazines established in 2007